Melanoplus devastator, the devastating grasshopper, is a species of spur-throated grasshopper in the family Acrididae. It is found in North America.

Subspecies
These three subspecies belong to the species Melanoplus devastator:
 Melanoplus devastator conspicuus Scudder, 1897 i c g
 Melanoplus devastator devastator Scudder, 1878 i c g
 Melanoplus devastator obscurus Scudder, 1897 i c g
Data sources: i = ITIS, c = Catalogue of Life, g = GBIF, b = Bugguide.net

References

External links

 

Melanoplinae
Articles created by Qbugbot
Insects described in 1878